Czech Republic competed at the 2012 Summer Olympics in London, United Kingdom, from 27 July to 12 August 2012. This was the nation's fifth appearance at the Summer Olympics after gaining its independence from the former Czechoslovakia. The Czech Olympic Committee sent a total of 133 athletes to the Games, 68 men and 65 women, to compete in 19 sports.

Czech Republic left London with a total of 11 medals (4 gold, 3 silver, and 4 bronze), the same total achieved in Atlanta. This was in stark contrast with the zero medal tally of the neighbouring Austria, a nation of roughly comparable size. Finishing the nineteenth position in the medal standings was the second best performance for the Czech Republic in the post-Czechoslovak era.

Among the nation's medalists were Barbora Špotáková, who successfully defended her Olympic title in women's javelin throw, and rower Ondřej Synek, who managed to repeat his silver medal in men's single sculls. Three Czech athletes won Olympic gold medals for the first time in history: single sculls rower Miroslava Knapková, modern pentathlete David Svoboda, and mountain biker Jaroslav Kulhavý. Several Czech athletes, however, missed out of medal standings in the finals, including rifle shooter and defending champion Kateřina Emmons, and javelin thrower Vítězslav Veselý.

For the first time in its history, the Czech House (located in the Business Design Centre in borough of Islington) had become accessible to the public (i.e. not only the team members and VIPs), attracting over 78,000 visitors during the Olympics. In a brief comparison of selected national centres, AP news agency even awarded this project an imaginary "gold medal". A moving sculpture by David Černý named London Booster (a life-sized London double-decker bus doing push-ups with humanoid arms) was a major feature outside the Czech House. Meanwhile, Czech presentation relied heavily on eccentricity. For example, the official outfit, in which Czech athletes paraded during the opening ceremonies (and some also entered podiums), featured bright blue Wellington boots (a pun on the stereotypically unstable British weather).

Medalists

| width=78% align=left valign=top |

|width=22% align=left valign=top |

Competitors
The Czech Olympic Committee selected a team of 133 athletes, 68 men and 65 women, to compete in 19 sports; this was the nation's second-largest team sent to the Olympics, tying the record (one athlete and two sports less) set by Beijing. Women's basketball was the only team-based sport in which the Czech Republic had its representation in these Olympic Games. There was only a single competitor in boxing, trampoline gymnastics, weightlifting, and wrestling.

The Czech team included five past Olympic champions, three of them defending (rifle shooter Kateřina Emmons, trap shooter David Kostelecký, and javelin thrower Barbora Špotáková). Finn sailor Michael Maier, at age 48, was the oldest athlete of the team, while swimmer Jan Micka was the youngest at age 17. Slalom canoer and double gold medalist Štěpánka Hilgertová, who had participated at every Olympic games since 1992, made her sixth appearance as the most experienced athlete.

Other notable Czech athletes featured decathlete and former Olympic champion Roman Šebrle, mountain biker Kateřina Nash, who competed at both Summer and Winter Olympic games, javelin thrower and defending world champion Vítězslav Veselý, and high jumper and former bronze medalist Jaroslav Bába. Badminton player and cancer survivor Petr Koukal was the nation's flag bearer at the opening ceremony.

| width=78% align=left valign=top |
The following is the list of number of competitors participating in the Games:

| width=22% align=left valign=top |

Athletics

Czech athletes have so far achieved qualifying standards in the following athletics events (up to a maximum of 3 athletes in each event at the 'A' Standard, and 1 at the 'B' Standard):

Key
 Note – Ranks given for track events are within the athlete's heat only
 Q = Qualified for the next round
 q = Qualified for the next round as a fastest loser or, in field events, by position without achieving the qualifying target
 NR = National record
 N/A = Round not applicable for the event
 Bye = Athlete not required to compete in round

Men
Track & road events

Field events

Combined events – Decathlon

Women
Track & road events

Field events

Combined events – Heptathlon

Badminton

Basketball

Czech Republic has qualified a women's team.
 Women's team – 1 team of 12 players

Women's tournament

Roster

Group play

Quarter-final

Boxing

Men

Canoeing

Slalom
Czech Republic has qualified boats for all slalom events.

Sprint
Czech Republic has qualified boats for the following events.

Qualification Legend: FA = Qualify to final (medal); FB = Qualify to final B (non-medal)

Cycling

Road

Track
Sprint

Keirin

Mountain biking

BMX

Gymnastics

Artistic
Men

Women

Trampoline

Judo

Czech Republic qualified 3 judokas.

Modern pentathlon

Czech Republic has qualified three athletes in modern pentathlon.

Rowing

Czech Republic has so far qualified boats for the following events

Men

Women

Qualification Legend: FA=Final A (medal); FB=Final B (non-medal); FC=Final C (non-medal); FD=Final D (non-medal); FE=Final E (non-medal); FF=Final F (non-medal); SA/B=Semifinals A/B; SC/D=Semifinals C/D; SE/F=Semifinals E/F; QF=Quarterfinals; R=Repechage

Sailing

Czech Republic has so far qualified 1 boat for each of the following events

Men

Women

M = Medal race; EL = Eliminated – did not advance into the medal race;

Shooting

Men

Women

Swimming

Czech swimmers have so far achieved qualifying standards in the following events (up to a maximum of 2 swimmers in each event at the Olympic Qualifying Time (OQT), and potentially 1 at the Olympic Selection Time (OST)):

Men

Women

Synchronized swimming

Czech Republic has qualified 2 quota places in synchronized swimming.

Table tennis

Tennis

Men

Women

Mixed

Triathlon

Czech Republic has qualified the following athletes.

Volleyball

Beach

Weightlifting

Czech Republic has qualified the following quota places.

Wrestling

Czech Republic has qualified 1 quota.

Key:
  - Victory by Fall.
  - Decision by Points - the loser with technical points.
  - Decision by Points - the loser without technical points.

Men's Greco-Roman

References

External links

Quota Place by Nation and Name
Czech House official site

Nations at the 2012 Summer Olympics
2012
2012 in Czech sport